Louis Leysen (22 January 1932 – 12 April 2009) was a Belgian footballer. He played in four matches for the Belgium national football team from 1957 to 1958.

References

External links
 

1932 births
2009 deaths
Belgian footballers
Belgium international footballers
Place of birth missing
Association footballers not categorized by position